Monique Jeannine Marie Drilhon (16 December 1922 – 11 December 2019) was a French athlete, specialising in the sprints.

Biography  
Drilhon was born in Bordeaux in December 1922. She won the title of 100 metres and 200 metres during the Athletics championships in France in 1943.

Selected for 1946 European Championships, at Oslo, Monique Drilhon won the silver medal in the 4 × 100 metres relay, with Léa Caurla,  Anne-Marie Colchen and Claire Brésolles.  The France team, which set a new record for France in 48.5 seconds in the relay, lost to the Netherlands.

Her married name was Dubreuilh. She died in December 2019 in Gradignan at the age of 96.

International competitions

Personal records

References

Sources 
 DocAthlé 2003, French Athletics Federation,p. 400

1922 births
2019 deaths
European Athletics Championships medalists
French female sprinters
Sportspeople from Bordeaux
20th-century French women